is a professional Japanese baseball player. He plays pitcher for the Yokohama DeNA BayStars.

External links

 NPB.com

1982 births
Living people
Baseball people from Gunma Prefecture
Jobu University alumni
Japanese expatriate baseball players in the United States
Honolulu Sharks players
Nippon Professional Baseball pitchers
Hokkaido Nippon-Ham Fighters players
Yokohama DeNA BayStars players